Mexican rock music, often referred to in Mexico as rock nacional ("national rock"), originated in the 1950s. Standards by The Beatles, Elvis Presley, The Everly Brothers, Nancy Sinatra, and Chuck Berry were soon covered by bands such as Los Apson, Los Teen Tops, Los Twisters, Los Hitters, Los Nómadas, Los Rockets, Los Locos del Ritmo, and Javier Bátiz, which later led to original compositions, often in English. The group "Los Nómadas" was the first racially integrated band of the 1950s. Their lead guitarist, Bill Aken (adopted son of Lupe Mayorga, effectively making Aken the cousin of Ritchie Valens), wrote most of their original material, including the raucous Donde-Donde, and co-wrote the material for their Sounds Of The Barrio album, which is still being sold. Their 1954 recording of She's My Babe was the first top 40 R&B recording by a Latino band. In the southwestern United States, Spanish guitar rhythms and Mexican musical influences may have inspired some of the music of American musicians Ritchie Valens, Danny Flores (of The Champs), Sam the Sham, Roy Orbison, and later, Herb Alpert. Initially, the public exhibited only moderate interest in them, because the media attention was focused on La Ola Inglesa (British Invasion).

However, after the substantial success of Mexican-American guitarist Carlos Santana in the United States in the late 1960s, along with the successful development of Mexico's own counterculture movement called La Onda (The Wave), many bands sprang up. Most of these bands sang in both Spanish and English, keeping foreign commercial exposure in mind. Mexican and Chicano rock have crossed into other Hispanic groups like José Feliciano and Lourdes Rodriguez, of Puerto Rican descent.

Origins: Orchestra and Jazz

Rock activity in Mexico in the 1950s took place either in Mexico City and the surrounding area or in northern cities such as Mexicali, Monterrey, Nuevo Laredo, Ciudad Juárez and Tijuana, whose proximity to the United States gave them more exposure to American sounds.

Rock & roll music was introduced to Mexico in the mid 1950s, as musicians like Elvis Presley and Bill Haley were at the peak of their popularity in the US, and their music began to be broadcast in Mexico and covered by Mexican bands.

In those early years, the first acts that performed and recorded rock & roll in the country were not rock "bands", but rather orchestras that combined jazz sounds with the new genre. Gloria Ríos, an American-born actress and lounge singer, is often credited with introducing rock & roll music in Mexico. Born in Texas in 1928, Ríos arrived in Mexico in 1944 and began recording in 1955 with many musicians (and their orchestras), such as Héctor Hallal, Jorge Ortega, Pablo Beltrán Ruiz, and most importantly, with Mario Patrón and his Estrellas del Ritmo. Many of her recordings were covers of songs by Bill Haley and Elvis Presley, but with Las Estrellas del Ritmo she also recorded "La mecedora" in 1956, a song composed by Mario Patrón, which was said to be the first original song of Mexican rock & roll. Ríos became very popular at the time due to her starring roles in films like "Las locuras del rock and roll" (1956) and "La rebelión de los adolescentes" (1957), but she later married Mario Patrón and in 1960 she went with him to Europe, where they stayed for many years. 

This caused Ríos to be quickly forgotten in Mexico, as the new golden age of rock & roll was starting there and new bands claimed to be the ones who had introduced the genre in Mexico. Ríos died in 2002 at the age of 74 years old.

These orchestras soon started to lose popularity as new rock bands appeared, formed by young musicians who mostly covered American and British songs. Los Lunáticos, founded in 1956, are considered by many to be the first Mexican rock and roll band, and later other bands like Los Locos del Ritmo, Los Rebeldes del Rock, Los Teen Tops, etc. became popular. Las Mary Jets, formed in 1959, were the first all-female rock band in Mexico. Rock, as elsewhere, became tied with the youth revolt of the 1960s.

Many songs are credited as being the first original Mexican rock & roll songs, amongst them:

"La mecedora" (1956), written by Mario Patrón and recorded by his orchestra and Gloria Ríos. This is considered to be the first original Mexican rock song in Spanish.
"Mexican rock and roll" (1956), written by Pablo Beltrán Ruiz and recorded by his orchestra, it's an instrumental piece.
"Where Did You Get It?" (1957), written by José Luis Arcaráz and recorded in English by Los Lunáticos.

Classic Rock

The 1960s are considered to be the "golden age" for rock music in Mexico; during this decade, rock groups frequently dominated the music charts and many of them became teen idols.
In the early years of the decade, groups like Los Rebeldes del Rock (whose recording "Hiedra venenosa" is considered to have been the first rock and roll recording to be broadcast in Mexican radio, back in 1959), Los Hooligans, Los Locos del Ritmo, among many others, became very famous recording Spanish-language covers of American and British rock standards, as well as some original songs.

One group in particular, Los Teen Tops was very popular in Mexico and in many other countries of the Hispanic world, specifically in Argentina and Spain; their recordings "La plaga" and "Popotitos" are considered some of the most representative of the era.

Festival Rock y Ruedas de Avándaro, La Onda

Many Mexican rock stars became involved in the counterculture movement. One of the most notorious bands from this decade was La Revolución de Emiliano Zapata, from Guadalajara, Mexico. After winning a local contest, they signed a contract with Polydor Records, and their single "Nasty Sex" was a #1 hit in Mexico in 1971, the only rock song from a Mexican band to achieve such a feat in that decade. However, after many members left the band and the Mexican government severely restricted the recording, publishing, and airplay of rock music in the country, the band (like many others at the time) changed its format and became a romantic ballad group.

The two-day Festival Rock y Ruedas de Avándaro, held in 1971, was organized in the hamlet of Tenantongo near the city of Toluca, a town neighboring Mexico City, and became known as "The Mexican Woodstock".

At that rock festival, nudity, free love, experimental drug use, profanity, the peace sign inserted in the Mexican flag and the presence of the American flag so scandalized the conservative Mexican society that the government imposed cultural curbs to La Onda, and especially to rock music. The media called the move El Avandarazo. The festival, intended to emulate Woodstock and Altamont, expected to attract a maximum of 25,000 concertgoers but about 300,000 showed up. The government helped some stranded attendees at the end of the festival by sending 300 buses.

During President Luis Echeverría's administration, the Mexican government tried to win back the country's legitimacy through populist, leftist-oriented programmes.

Most things that could possibly be connected to the counterculture or to student protests were sidelined on public airwaves by the powers that be, who feared a repeat of the student protests of 1968, an event the new government denounced. But most Mexican rock bands sang and criticized the administration in general and, more specifically, corruption, poverty and persistent social inequalities that had taken place through Mexican history.

With the Avandarazo effect at its height and the hippie movement waning worldwide, few bands survived the curbs; though the ones that did, like Three Souls in My Mind (later El Tri), remained popular due in part to their adoption of Spanish for their lyrics, and had a dedicated following. As the hippie trend waned c. 1973, many Mexican bands moved to progressive and hard rock. During the seventies there were many new bands but very little support from the music industry for original rock music. Representative bands of this period were: Perro Fantastico, Mara, Vox Populi, Stray Cat, Rock Moviloy and many more. Perro Fantastico, a band from the east side of Mexico City (Ciudad Nezahualcoyotl) created rock music sung in both Spanish and English, formed by the brothers Jose Luis and Jaime Francisco González (guitar and bass) with Guillermo Avalos (drums) and Arturo Fajardo (rhythm guitar). They played, among other bands, in places like Salon Chicago, Macumba, El Herradero until the band disbanded around 1978. During the seventies bands also performed in high schools, universities and other places. Many others followed or continued during the eighties.

Ban on Rock
The government's ban on rock music during this decade also extended to American groups, and after a 1975 concert in Mexico City by the band Chicago ended with turbulence and police repression, president Echeverría issued a temporary ban on all concerts by American musicians in Mexico.

Metal

Since the 1960s, hard rock had been assimilated by several groups, like the aforementioned Los Dug Dugs and El Ritual, and later by others like Polvo and Náhuatl, Nuevo México and Bloody Rock. During the following decade it continued to exist in forms of heavy blues, which was an authentic underground movement, peaking in the late 1970s when the Hoyos Funky came to notoriety around 1977.

Groups like Ramses and La Cruz are veterans of the era and were some of the first to be labeled as "heavy metal", but then again it was not until the 1980s and the early 1990s that bands like Transmetal, Next, Luzbel and Semefo contributed to the scene with original approaches, when the most radical forms of the genre like death metal and grindcore were fully digested. Today the metal scene is populated by such groups as Brujeria, Hacavitz, and Disgorge.

The early bands were followed by many others, in an ever-growing underground movement of sports arenas weekend concerts all over the country.

Important bands of this period were

Rupestre Music

Since the late 1960s, poets have sung to acoustic guitars and played in the then-prosperous café cantante scene. These forums showcased the folkloric music that came from South America, specially from Peru and Chile. Performers like Víctor Jara, Violeta Parra, Inti-Illimani, Los Folkloristas and local Óscar Chávez among many others denounced in their songs the atrocities of the military juntas, all of which experimented with even worse repression than Mexico during the Tlatelolco incident, that governed most of the countries from Nicaragua to Tierra del Fuego, and curiously the cafes cantantes thrived, as long as nothing was overtly critical of the Mexican government in general.

The scene eclipsed by the early 1980s, but several musicians like Rockdrigo, sometimes nicknamed "the Mexican Bob Dylan" developed a uniquely Mexican folk style, which came to be known as música rupestre. Later, the musicians were dubbed 'Los Urbanos', because although they played acoustic guitars, the themes of their lyrics revealed the adverse conditions the working class had to face in the big cities, and blues forms were incorporated in their compositions. When El Tri made an electric rendition of Rockdrigo's Metro Balderas the fusion of rock and música rupestre was consummated. Many others continued to surface, but Rockdrigo's untimely death during the earthquake of 1985 in Mexico City skyrocketed his already legendary status, and thus he is considered the most influential exponent of both rock urbano and música rupestre.

Other notable bands were Banda Bostik, Sur 16, Tex-Tex and Interpuesto. The racially integrated group Los Nómadas was one of the few to survive for decades. Members of the group consisted of Chico Vasquez, Jose 'J.D.' Moreno, Abel Padilla, and Bill Aken, who formed the band in 1953; they stayed together until well into the 1990s. They were often called into recording sessions to back up Mexicano artists such as Freddy Fender. Their final recording session was in early 1994; when Chico Vasquez died several months later, the group disbanded. The most prominent member of the group was singer-songwriter and producer Bill Aken (aka Zane Ashton), the adopted son of Mexican actress Lupe Mayorga and the only Caucasian member of the band.

The Chopo

 

In 1980, the National University of Mexico UNAM, through one of its cultural departments, invited the general public to bring their LP records and trade them with others at the Museo Universitario del Chopo in Mexico City, every Saturday morning.

Initially the trading took place inside the facilities of the museum, but by the end of the year the increasing number of attendees became too large for the venue, as collectors sought records that were otherwise impossible to get from established outlets. The trading became selling in many cases, with record dealers taking advantage of the new market for rock "rarities". The gathering extended to the street right in front of the museum, and several stands were erected, transforming the event into a tianguis, a kind of outdoor flea market or bazaar. The museum became a popular hang-out for punks, new wavers, hippies, rastafaris, and other subcultures who were able to express themselves freely at the weekly gathering and meet others with the same tastes.

The museum and the National University eventually broke ties with the tianguis, stating that it had got out of hand, and due to increasing friction with local residents, the government soon tried to ban it. By now the participants had established themselves into a community, and collectively presented a proposition to the local government dependency, offering to maintain the necessary security and pay a permanent fee.

However, the officials were reluctant, and between 1982 and 1989 the "Chopo", while still growing, changed locations six times, from parks to parking lots to faculty gardens, always due to pressure from officials.

Since 1990 it has been taking place on a street behind the Buenavista railway station, less than three blocks from the original 'Museo del Chopo' location. From the original 100 people that began attending in 1980, it is estimated that more than 10,000 people now visit the tianguis every week. As well as the original record trading, other products sold and displayed at the event include clothing, posters, movies, handicrafts, magazines, books, instruments, and other rock-related paraphernalia.

Spanish Invasion and Response
Concurrent to the second wave British Invasion in the U.S., the Mexican rock scene in the early 1980s immediately fell prey to a “European Invasion” of its own with various artists from Spain taking over the radio. Influential Spanish rock bands like Hombres G, Mecano, Radio Futura and La Unión took over the spotlight with their experimental sounds and melancholic lyrics. Mexico’s music culture saw a newly inspired generation of rock bands emerge in response such Caifanes, Maná, Ritmo Peligroso, Botellita de Jeréz, El Tri and the Micro Chips.

Mexican pop music on the other hand (a genre known for its trademark ballads) saw an unexpected explosion of success by incorporating early synths into an overall more pop rock based production with bands such as Timbiriche, Pandora, and Flans dominating the charts alongside Spanish pop bands like Olé-Olé.

Rock in Monterrey

Starting in the 90s, the city of Monterrey in the Mexican state of Nuevo Léon witnessed the birth of several bands that have become internationally acclaimed. Their genres vary considerably, but they include Jumbo, Volován, Panda, Plastilina Mosh, COhETICA, Zurdok, Kinky, El Gran Silencio, Genitallica, and the heavy metal band IRA.

The song Los Oxidados by Plastilina Mosh opens the 2005 movie Mr. & Mrs. Smith. Kinky performed at the 2004 edition of the Coachella Valley Music and Arts Festival in Indio, California, along with Radiohead, The Cure and The Killers. A few of the popular local live music venues in Monterrey include the Arena Monterrey, the Auditorio Banamex, and local clubs Cafe Iguana and McMullen's, both located in the Barrio Antiguo section of the city. The all girl Monterrey Heavy Rock band The Warning is proving increasingly popular. Their album, titled Queen of the Murder Scene, was released on November 25, 2018. It achieved high showings in the iTunes and Amazon rock music charts for several weeks after release, despite it being independent.

Alternative and Indie rock

 
In the 1990s and 2000s, a number of performers have attained international renown, including alternative rock acts such as Santa Sabina, Café Tacuba, Fobia, Caifanes (now Jaguares), Julieta Venegas, ska band Maldita Vecindad, and synthpop group Mœnia.

Control Machete, Delasónica and Molotov explored rap/rock fusion, with lyrics containing social commentary mixed with urban vulgarity. The most popular Mexican rock group during this period has been Maná, which have sold over 22 million albums worldwide.

Modern rock

The 2000s also saw the emergence of a new generation of Mexican alternative and indie rock musicians. Alternative groups and artists such as Motel, Reik, Allison, Panda, Hello Seahorse!, División Minúscula, Zoé, Natalia Lafourcade, and Insite have received mainstream success in Mexico and throughout Latin America.

The indie music scene in Mexico has produced bands such as Porter, Austin TV, Animal Gang, The Copper Gamins, inspired by The White Stripes, from more remote central Mexico, Los Dynamite, Chikita Violenta, Los Jaigüey, Secret Agent, Bengala, and Hello Seahorse!, who often write lyrics in English and have toured alongside American indie rock bands throughout Latin America and the United States.

Popular electronic music and synthpop groups include Moenia, Belanova, Jotdog, Sussie 4, Hocico, Amduscia and The Nortec Collective.

See also  

Chicano rock
Rock en tu idioma
Latino punk
Avanzada Regia
La Onda

References

External links 
  Mexican rock at  Last.fm

Rock
Music scenes

Mexico